Goyeneche Palace may refer to any of a number of palaces in Peru and Spain which are associated with the Goyeneche family. They are listed in order of the town in which they are situated:

 Goyeneche Palace, Arequipa, Peru
 Goyeneche Palace, Illana, Spain
 Goyeneche Palace, Lima, Peru
 Goyeneche Palace, Madrid, Spain (better known as the Real Academia de Bellas Artes de San Fernando)
 Goyeneche Palace, Nuevo Baztán, Spain